"Hey, Mister Sun" is a song by Bobby Sherman released in 1970. The song spent nine weeks on the Billboard Hot 100 chart, peaking at No. 24, while reaching No. 3 on Billboards Easy Listening chart. In Canada, the song reached No. 19 on the "RPM 100", and No. 7 on Toronto's CHUM 30 chart.

Chart performance

References

1970 songs
1970 singles
Bobby Sherman songs